Low Kay Hwa (born June 18, 1985) is a Singaporean novelist known for his teen romance novels. He also runs a lifestyle page for Singaporeans.

Biography
Low Kay Hwa has studied in Boon Lay Primary School, Hong Kah Secondary School and Singapore Polytechnic, and he is pursuing his B.A. in English and literature from SIM University on a part-time basis.

Low published his first novel in 2003, and set up his own publishing company in 2005. He has published 12 novels. His novel A Singapore Love Story made it to Singapore's Sunday Times bestsellers lists.

Works
 Destiny’s Cries (2004, The Word Press) 
 I Believe You (2005, 2012, Goody Books)  
 You Are Here (2006, Goody Books) 
 Journey (2006, 2012, Goody Books)  
 A Photogenic Life (2007, 2012, Goody Books)  
 To Forget You (2008, 2012, Goody Books)  
 Lilith (2009, 2012, Goody Books)  
 The Perfect Story (2010, 2012, Goody Books)  
 For That Day (2011, Goody Books) 
 A Singapore Love Story (2011, Goody Books) 
 I (2011, 2013, Goody Books) 
 Today or Tomorrow (2014, Goody Books)

References
https://www.techinasia.com/talk/marketers-facebook-goody-feed

Singaporean novelists
Living people
1985 births
Singaporean writers